Raja Shankar or Rajashankar  was an Indian actor in Kannada cinema. His films include Bhakta Kumbara (1974), Sampathige Saval (1974) and Sri Srinivasa Kalyana (1974). He also co-produced the 1974 Kannada movie Bangaarada Panjara starring Dr. Rajkumar and the 1976 Kannada movie Vijaya Vani.

Career
Shankar has appeared in more than 50 movies in Kannada.

Personal life
His family lives in Malleswaram, Bangalore. There is a park and playground named after him at 1st Cross, Malleswaram, Bangalore. His youngest daughter, Chaya, contested the 17th Lok Sabha elections from Tumakuru representing the political party of the actor Upendra.

Selected filmography

 Abba Aa Hudugi (1959)
 Kittur Chennamma (1961)
 Malli Maduve (1963)
 Saaku Magalu (1963)
 Kanyarathna (1963)
 Mangala Muhurta (1964)
 Manassiddare Marga (1967)
 Sri Purandara Dasaru (1967)
 Manassiddare Marga (1967)
 Broker Bheeshmachari (1969)
 Vaagdaana (1970)
 Hoo Bisilu (1971)
 Kasturi Nivasa (1971)
 Hoo Bisilu (1971)
 Signalman Siddappa (1971)
 Bangaarada Panjara (1974)
 Hemareddi Mallamma (1974)
 Sampathige Savaal (1974)
 Sri Srinivasa Kalyana  (1974)
 Daari Tappida Maga (1975)
 Mayura (1975)
 Daari Tappida Maga (1975)
 Bahaddur Gandu (1976)
 Premada Kanike (1976)
 Aarada Gaaya (1980)

See also

List of people from Karnataka
Cinema of Karnataka
List of Indian film actors
Cinema of India

References

External links

RajaShankar on Chiloka

Kannada people
Male actors in Kannada cinema
Indian male film actors
Male actors from Karnataka
20th-century Indian male actors
21st-century Indian male actors
1931 births
1987 deaths